Frédéric Mendy may refer to:
Frédéric Mendy (footballer, born 1973), French footballer
Frédéric Mendy (footballer, born 1981), Senegalese footballer
Frédéric Mendy (footballer, born 1988), Bissau-Guinean footballer